Liam Bennett may refer to:
 Liam Bennett (hurler)
 Liam Bennett (footballer)